Javier "Javi" Bonilla Sevillano (born 25 October 1990) is a Spanish footballer who plays for Gimnàstic de Tarragona as either a left back or a left winger.

Club career
Born in Soria, Castile and León, Bonilla began his career with hometown club CD Numancia, making his senior debut with the reserves in the 2008–09 season. On 7 February 2011 he made his debut with the first team, in a 0–4 away defeat against RC Celta de Vigo in the Segunda División.

In his second appearance with the main squad, on 16 May 2012, Bonilla was handed a start, and scored the third goal in a 3–1 win at Hércules CF. On 27 January 2015, after featuring in only one competitive match during the campaign, he moved abroad and signed for Greek Football League side Aiginiakos FC, returning home on 27 August to SD Leioa of Segunda División B. 

In his first and only season for the Basques, Bonilla scored in the first leg of their 5–2 aggregate win over CD Olímpic de Xàtiva in the relegation play-off. On 10 June 2016, he moved to fellow league team Pontevedra CF.

Bonilla continued competing in the third division in the following years, representing RCD Mallorca (where he achieved promotion in 2018), UD Ibiza and Gimnàstic de Tarragona.

References

External links

1990 births
Living people
People from Soria
Sportspeople from the Province of Soria
Spanish footballers
Footballers from Castile and León
Association football defenders
Association football wingers
Segunda División players
Segunda División B players
Tercera División players
CD Numancia B players
CD Numancia players
SD Leioa players
Pontevedra CF footballers
RCD Mallorca players
UD Ibiza players
Gimnàstic de Tarragona footballers
Football League (Greece) players
Aiginiakos F.C. players
Spanish expatriate footballers
Expatriate footballers in Greece
Spanish expatriate sportspeople in Greece